Events from the 1420s in Denmark.

Incumbents
 Monarch – Eric of Pomerania

Events
1422
  Erik of Pommeria issues Den store Købstadsforordning which determines that all market towns are to be governed by two mayors.
 15 February and 28 October – Eric of Pomerania grants the town of Copenhagen market rights.

1422
 Sound Dues are introduced at Helsingør.

1426
 2 June  Helsingør is granted new and extended market rights.
 Undated  The Dano-Hanseatic War (1426–1435) breaks out.

1427
 21 July – A fleet from the Hanseatic League has been sent out to attack Copenhagen as a reaction to the Sound Dues but is defeated by a Danish fleet in the Øresund.

1428
 16 April  15 June – Bombardment of Copenhagen (1428): A fleet from the Hanseatic League attacks Copenhagen several times, using canons for the first time in the Nordic countries, but ultimately has to withdraw.

1429
 Copenhagen's Goldsmiths' Guild is mentioned for the first time. The town is home to six goldsmiths.

Births

Deaths

References

1420s in Denmark